The Koxx (Hangul: 칵스) is a South Korean indie rock band that formed in 2009. They are also involved in the production of k-pop songs.

History 
In 2008, The Koxx got together and played a show for an end of the year party with friends. Afterwards they formed a band starting in 2009 and debuted on the reality show Hello Rookie. They released their first EP, Enter, on June 15, 2010. On June 15, 2011, The Koxx released their first studio album, Access OK. At the end of the year, The Koxx held their first solo concert, Success OK, and went on a tour in Japan, playing at clubs in Tokyo, Osaka, and Nagoya.

The Koxx won the "Discovery of the Year" Award on February 22, 2012 at the Gaon Chart K-Pop Awards. Beginning in 2012, the band began appearing on KBS' reality show Top Band 2. On June 26, 2012 they released their second EP, Bon Voyage. The Koxx began hiatus in 2013 when many of the members began their military service.

In 2015, The Koxx announced they would perform at Fuji Rock Festival and that they were working to release a new album that same year.

Members 
 Lee Hyunsong (이현송) - vocals, guitar
 Lee Sooryun (이수륜) - guitar
 Park Sunbin (박선빈) - bass
 Shaun (숀) - synthesizers, supporting vocals

Past members 
 Shin Saron (신사론) - drums

Discography

Studio albums

Extended plays

Singles

References

External links 
 

2009 establishments in South Korea
South Korean indie rock groups
Musical groups established in 2009